Martin Schindler (born 16 August 1996) is a German professional darts player who plays in Professional Darts Corporation (PDC) events.

Career
Schindler won a PDC Tour Card at Qualifying-School (Q-School) in January 2017. He represented Germany along with Max Hopp at the 2017 PDC World Cup of Darts, reaching the quarter-finals, before losing to the Dutch pair of Michael van Gerwen and Raymond van Barneveld. In the same year he debuted on a ranking major, playing 2017 European Championship, where he lost to Rob Cross 0–6.

He qualified for 2018 PDC World Darts Championship and faced Australian Simon Whitlock in the first round, losting 1–3 on sets. After that he made his first appearance also on 2018 UK Open, making it to the 4th round. Along with Max Hopp he represented Germany in 2018 PDC World Cup of Darts and once again they made it to the quarter-finals. For the second time in a row he qualified for 2018 European Championship, where he lost to James Wade 3–6 in the first round. Later on in the year he was a runner-up in 2018 PDC World Youth Championship, in the final he lost 3–6 to Dimitri van den Bergh. Schindler qualified for 2018 Grand Slam of Darts, playing in a group with Stephen Bunting, Mensur Suljovic and Scott Mitchell. He lost the first two matches against Bunting and Mitchell, in the last match he defeated Suljovic in the deciding leg. In spite of that, he placed 4th in the group and did not qualify for the second round. He made his debut on 2018 Players Championship Finals, where he lost to Nathan Aspinall 1–6 in the first round. He finished the season in top 50 of PDC Order of Merit.

Via Pro Tour Order of Merit Schindler qualified for 2019 PDC World Darts Championship and faced New Zealand qualifier Cody Harris to whom he lost 2–3 on sets in the first round. In 2019 UK Open he made it to the fifth round, during the year he struggled to qualify for European Tour events, making only two appearances this year and failed to qualify for European Championship. With Hopp they again represented Germany on 2019 PDC World Cup of Darts, they lost to Belgium in the second round. Still eligible to play 2019 PDC World Youth Championship Schindler made it to querter-finals of the event, losing to Ryan Meikle. As the runner-up of 2018 PDC World Youth Championship he qualified for 2019 Grand Slam of Darts, playing in the group with Michael Smith, Glen Durrant and Nathan Aspinall. Unable to win any of the three matches, he was eliminated after the round robin. He faced Michael Smith again in 2019 Players Championship Finals and lost in the first round.

Despite not qualifying for 2020 PDC World Darts Championship, Schindler was able to secure his Tour card and continued on the professional tour. The season was hit by the coronavirus pandemic, Martin repeated the fifth round in 2020 UK Open, but was unable to qualify for any other major event this season. He dropped down the rankings and his spot in Germany team for World Cup of Darts was taken by Gabriel Clemens. Schindler made his final appearance on 2020 PDC World Youth Championship, repeating the quarter-finals, where he lost to the later youth world champion, Bradley Brooks.

After four years on the tour, Schindler lost his Tour Card after the 2021 PDC World Darts Championship, where he did not qualify. He won his Tour Card immediately back at the 2021 European Q School via the Order of Merit. He made it to the third round of 2021 UK Open, his other big event was 2021 Grand Slam of Darts, to where he qualified via PDC Qualifying Event in November. He played in the group with Gerwyn Price, Nathan Rafferty and Krzysztof Ratajski, lost first two matches against Ratajski and Rafferty. He won over Price in the last match, but placed 4th in the group and was eliminated. Schindler secured his first win on 2021 Players Championship Finals, where he defeated Ian White, losing to Price in the second round.
Schindler then won the 2021 PDC Europe Super League to qualify for the 2022 PDC World Darts Championship.

After two-year break Schindler played 2022 PDC World Darts Championship, but lost to fellow German Florian Hempel 0–3 in the first round. In 2022 UK Open he made it to the fifth round, later on he made his debut on two other majors, qualifying for 2022 World Matchplay and 2022 World Grand Prix. Schindler returned to the Germany squad for 2022 PDC World Cup of Darts and with Clemens by his side they made it to the quarter-finals, where they lost to Wales. For the first time since 2018 he qualified for 2022 European Championship.

World Championship results

PDC
 2018: First round (lost to Simon Whitlock 1–3)
 2019: First round (lost to Cody Harris 2–3)
 2022: First round (lost to Florian Hempel 0–3)
 2023: Third round (lost to Michael Smith 3–4)

Performance timeline

PDC European Tour

References

External links

Living people
German darts players
1996 births
PDC World Cup of Darts German team
Professional Darts Corporation current tour card holders
People from Strausberg
Sportspeople from Brandenburg
21st-century German people